Nehan, also known as Nissan, is an Austronesian language of Nissan Island, north of Bougainville, Papua New Guinea.

References

External links
Syntactic Ergativity in Nehan (PDF)

Northwest Solomonic languages
Languages of Papua New Guinea